La Folletière is a former commune in the Seine-Maritime department in the Normandy region in northern France. On 1 January 2016, it was merged into the new commune of Saint-Martin-de-l'If.

Geography

Population

Places of interest
 The sixteenth century church was demolished in 1828.

See also
Communes of the Seine-Maritime department

References

Former communes of Seine-Maritime